Pohja is a former municipality of Finland. It was consolidated with Ekenäs and Karis to form the new town of Raseborg in 2009.

It is located in the province of Southern Finland and is part of the Uusimaa region.

The municipality was bilingual, with majority being Finnish (60%) and minority Swedish (40%) speakers. Pohja is one of the birthplaces of the Finnish metal industry. Fiskars Corporation was founded near Pohja in 1649 and remains the largest employer in municipality area to date.

Notable residents
Charles Linn – one of the founders of Birmingham, Alabama
 Peter Lindroos – opera singer

References

External links 

Populated places disestablished in 2009
2009 disestablishments in Finland
Former municipalities of Finland
Raseborg